Mesomphalia turrita  is a species of leaf beetles belonging to the family Chrysomelidae. This species occurs in Brazil.

References
 Biolib
 Encyclopaedia of Life
  Inventory of the Cassidinae species (Insecta, Coleoptera, Chrysomelidae) of the Parque Nacional do Itatiaia, RJ, Brazil
 L BOROWIEC   New records of Neotropical tortoise beetles

Cassidinae
Beetles described in 1801